The Tun Razak Exchange MRT station, also known as the TRX MRT Station, is an underground mass rapid transit (MRT) station which currently serves the Jalan Tun Razak, Jalan Kamuning, Jalan Inai and Jalan Delima areas of Kuala Lumpur, Malaysia. In the future, the station will serve the new Tun Razak Exchange (TRX) financial district that is currently being developed.

The station is on the MRT Kajang Line, formerly known as Sungai Buloh-Kajang Line (SBK). It was opened on 17 July 2017 as part of Phase Two operations of the MRT line.

The station is designed to be an interchange station with the MRT Putrajaya Line, which opened to public on 16 March 2023.

Station features

Station location
The station is an underground station located next to Jalan Tun Razak near the Kampung Pandan Roundabout in Kuala Lumpur, Malaysia.

The station is planned to be an integral part of the future Tun Razak Exchange financial district, and is located at the eastern edge of the development. In view of this, the interior design of the station was given the theme "Islamic corporate" and adopts the Islamic geometric motifs on its pillars and walls.

Station layout 
This station is the deepest station on the MRT Kajang Line and has 7 underground levels in addition to the ground level. Of the 7 levels, 4 are public floors while the others house machinery and equipment.

Exits and Entrances
The station has two entrances, Entrance A at the northern end of the station and Entrance B at the southern end. Both entrances have escalators, stairs and lifts. The entrances are located at the ground level plazas allowing access to the station access road which runs from Jalan Delima to Jalan Tun Razak (via what was previously the Jalan Selatan).

Integration with the MRT Putrajaya Line 

The Tun Razak Exchange station is designed as an interchange station with the MRT Putrajaya Line, making it the second interchange between the two lines, the other being Kwasa Damansara. As a result, the Tun Razak Exchange has a stacked island platform configuration, to enable cross-platform transfers between the MRT lines. As of 16 March 2023, platform 3 and 4 which serves the MRT Putrajaya Line is now open to the public.

In early planning, the interchange was originally going to be at Taman Connaught, but was moved to here during planning.

History
The area in which the station is located was previously occupied by quarters allocated to Government employees. The quarters were demolished and at the spot where the station is located currently, an arts and craft market was established, with the name "Pasar Rakyat" or "People's Market". Because of this, the working name for the Tun Razak Exchange Station was the Pasar Rakyat Station.

Bus services

Nearby
 Zouk KL
 RHB Bank national headquarters
 Johor Corporation Kuala Lumpur office
 Royal Selangor Golf Club
 Entrance to  SMART Tunnel

Gallery

References

External links
 Tun Razak Exchange MRT station | mrt.com.my
 Klang Valley Mass Rapid Transit website
 MRT Hawk-Eye View

Rapid transit stations in Kuala Lumpur
Sungai Buloh-Kajang Line
Sungai Buloh-Serdang-Putrajaya Line
Railway stations opened in 2017